"Lament" is the third single and title track from Ultravox's seventh studio album, released on 21 June 1984.

The music video depicting the band members visiting their lovers on a remote Scottish island. The video was filmed in Elgol, Kilmarie, and Broadford Hall.

The single was less successful than the band's previous release, peaking at #22 in the United Kingdom and #47 in New Zealand.

Track listing

7" version 
 "Lament" – 4:17
 "Heart Of The Country (Instrumental)" – 4:24

12" version 
 "Lament (Extended Mix)" – 8:01
 "Heart Of The Country (Instrumental)" – 3:48
 "Lament" [single edit] – 4:17

References 

1984 singles
1984 songs
Ultravox songs
Songs written by Midge Ure
Songs written by Warren Cann
Songs written by Chris Cross
Songs written by Billy Currie
Chrysalis Records singles